Sylvain Legwinski (born 10 June 1973) is a French former professional footballer, who played as a midfielder. He is now assistant coach at AS Monaco in France.

Having made a name for himself at AS Monaco and Bordeaux, he played seven years of his professional career in England, collecting more than 200 official appearances for Fulham and Ipswich Town.

Club career
Legwinski was born in Clermont-Ferrand. The son of a basketball player with Polish descent who settled at Vichy, he joined AS Monaco FC's youth system at 18, as Arsène Wenger was the main squad's manager, giving the player his first team debuts shortly after. He developed into a midfield force under Jean Tigana's guidance, scoring nine league goals in 1996–97, as Monaco won the national title.

After two seasons and four games into 2001–02 with FC Girondins de Bordeaux, Legwinski rejoined Tigana at Fulham. At the beginning of the 2006–07 season, new Fulham boss Chris Coleman made it clear that Legwinski did not fit into the side's future plans and, in August 2006, following a successful trial with Ipswich Town, the player signed a two-year contract.

In his first year at the club, Legwinski won the supporter's and manager's Player of the Year Award for 2006–07, netting five league goals. During the campaign, he became the only Ipswich player to have scored against all East Anglian opposition during one season (Norwich City, Colchester United, Southend United and Luton Town).

However, Legwinski found himself out of the picture for much of the following season, still managing to find the net twice, in draws against Queen's Park Rangers and Burnley. Due to the team's extensive midfield, he was told he would not be offered a new contract and, as Town teammate Fabian Wilnis, started looking to the future, working towards his coaching badges.

In September 2008, Legwinski underwent an unsuccessful trial with Swedish team IFK Göteborg. Early in the following year, he had another tryout in the country, with Örgryte IS, which had just won promotion to the top flight.

In March 2009, Legwinski joined St Neots Town as a player/assistant manager, joining player-manager Steve Lomas. Shortly after, definitely retired, he moved to Crystal Palace as a youth coach.
He is now assistant coach at AS Monaco in France.

International career
An under-21 international, Legwinski scored once in four matches for the 1996 Summer Olympics quarter-finalists.

Career statistics

Honours

Club
Monaco
French League: 1996–97, 1999–2000

Fulham
UEFA Intertoto Cup: 2002

Individual
Ipswich Town Player of the Year: 2006–07
Ipswich Town Players' Player of the Year: 2006–07

References

External links
 

1973 births
Living people
Sportspeople from Clermont-Ferrand
French footballers
French people of Polish descent
Association football midfielders
Ligue 1 players
AS Monaco FC players
FC Girondins de Bordeaux players
Premier League players
English Football League players
Fulham F.C. players
Ipswich Town F.C. players
St Neots Town F.C. players
Footballers at the 1996 Summer Olympics
Olympic footballers of France
French expatriate footballers
Expatriate footballers in England
French expatriate sportspeople in England
Footballers from Auvergne-Rhône-Alpes